Mandalena Christou (born 13 December 1990) is a Cypriot footballer who plays as a goalkeeper. She has been a member of the Cyprus women's national team.

Club career
On 28 September 2010, Christou joined Apollon Ladies FC.

International career
Christou capped for Cyprus at senior level during the 2017 Aphrodite Cup, including a 1–2 loss to Latvia on 12 March 2017.

References

1990 births
Living people
Women's association football goalkeepers
Cypriot women's footballers
Cyprus women's international footballers
Apollon Ladies F.C. players
Barcelona FA players